Miami Public Schools (MPS) is a school district headquartered in Miami, Oklahoma. Its attendance area includes most of the city; the northern portion is instead in Commerce Public Schools.

Jeremy Hogan became the superintendent circa 2016. That year the district estimated that due to cutbacks in aid from the Oklahoma state government, it would have $619,000 less and $700,000 less in fiscal years 2017 and 2018, respectively.

Hogan began a strategic planning program in 2017.

Schools
 Secondary
 Miami High School
 Will Rogers Middle School 

 Elementary
 Nichols Upper Elementary School
 Roosevelt
 Washington
 Wilson

Pre-Kindergarten is at Washington and Wilson elementaries.

 Alternative
 Miami Academy

 Other facilities

References

External links
 Miami Public Schools
School districts in Oklahoma
Education in Ottawa County, Oklahoma
Miami, Oklahoma